Algerico Chavez, better known as Eric Chavez, is a Filipino former professional boxer who competed from 1985 to 1998. He held the IBF mini-flyweight title from 1989 to 1990

Professional career

Chavez turned professional in 1985 and compiled a record of 25–0–3 before facing and defeating Nico Thomas, to win the IBF Mini flyweight title. He would lose the title in his first defense against Fahlan Sakkreerin.

Professional boxing record

See also
List of world mini-flyweight boxing champions
List of Filipino boxing world champions

References

External links

 

Year of birth missing (living people)
Living people
Filipino male boxers
Boxers from Cebu
International Boxing Federation champions
World mini-flyweight boxing champions